René Barret (6 August 1922 – 28 November 2009) was a French racing cyclist. He rode in the 1947 Tour de France. Another René Barret participated to 1913 Tour de France.

References

External links
 

1922 births
2009 deaths
French male cyclists
Sportspeople from Montreuil, Seine-Saint-Denis
Cyclists from Île-de-France